The Superior Court of California, County of Del Norte, also known as the Del Norte County Superior Court or  Del Norte Superior Court, is the branch of the California superior court with jurisdiction over Del Norte County.

History
Del Norte County was formed in 1857, partitioned from the now-dissolved Klamath County, with Crescent City named as the county seat.

It was destroyed by fire in the early morning of January 18, 1948. The architect for the 1884 courthouse was S.P. Marsh.

Court operations were temporarily moved to the Veterans Memorial Hall in Crescent City until the current replacement courthouse was built in 1958 to a design by William Mabry Van Fleet. As designed, the 1958 courthouse has  of floor space.

References

External links
 
 

Superior Court
Superior courts in California